Ralston Run is a  long 1st order tributary to Dutch Fork in Washington County, Pennsylvania.

Course
Ralston Run rises about 2 miles southwest of Budaville, Pennsylvania, in Washington County and then flows southeast then northeast to join Dutch Fork about 1 mile south-southwest of Budaville.

Watershed
Ralston Run drains  of area, receives about 40.4 in/year of precipitation, has a wetness index of 286.81, and is about 68% forested.

See also
List of Pennsylvania rivers

References

Rivers of Pennsylvania
Rivers of Washington County, Pennsylvania